Bossiaea preissii is a species of flowering plant in the family Fabaceae and is endemic to the south of Western Australia. It is a compact, glabrous shrub with egg-shaped leaves with the narrower end towards the base, and yellow, red, orange or apricot-coloured flowers.

Description
Muelleria 23: |journal=Muelleria |date=2006 |volume=11 |pages=83–86 |url=https://www.biodiversitylibrary.org/item/278250#page/85/mode/1up |access-date=22 August 2021}}</ref>

Taxonomy and namingBossiaea preissii was first formally described in 1844 by Carl Meissner in Lehmann's Plantae Preissianae from specimens collected at Cape Riche in 1840. The specific epithet (preissii) honours Ludwig Preiss.

Distribution and habitat
This bossiaea usually grows in sand on dunes along the coast and in gravelly soils in low scrub or heathland further inland, in the Avon Wheatbelt, Esperance Plains, Jarrah Forest and Mallee biogeographic regions of southern Western Australia.

Conservation statusBossiaea preissii'' is classified as "not threatened" by the Western Australian Government Department of Parks and Wildlife.

References

preissii
Mirbelioids
Flora of Western Australia
Plants described in 1844
Taxa named by Carl Meissner